.44 caliber is a family of large-caliber firearm cartridges and firearms, particularly revolvers. The most well-known is the .44 Magnum which uses a bullet that is actually .429 inches in diameter. Though less common than the smaller .38 caliber family of cartridges, the caliber is popular with many shooters and the .44 Magnum in particular facilitated the rise of handgun hunting. Its role as the most powerful handgun cartridge has been superseded by various recently developed .45 caliber and .50 caliber handgun chamberings.

The caliber was also common in American Civil War-era cap & ball revolvers such as the Colt Army Model 1860 and the Remington Model 1858, offering more stopping power than the .36 caliber revolvers of the time. Notably, the derringer that John Wilkes Booth used to assassinate Abraham Lincoln was .44 caliber.

Cartridges
The following dimensions are given in millimeters (inches).

Handguns

Rifles

See also

References

Pistol and rifle cartridges